Rene Carpenter (April 12, 1928July 24, 2020) was an American newspaper columnist and host of two Washington, D.C., television shows.
As the wife of Scott Carpenter, one of the Mercury Seven astronauts, she was a pioneering member of NASA's early spaceflight families.

Early life and education
Carpenter was born in Clinton, Iowa, on April 12, 1928. Her mother, Olive (Olson) Mason, became one of the first female clerks at the station in Clinton, Iowa, for the Chicago and North Western Railroad. Her husband, Melville Francis Mason, had been a brakeman for Chicago and Northwestern but became unemployed during the Great Depression. They divorced in 1930, when Carpenter was two years old. Her mother would go on to marry Lyle S. Price in 1935. He adopted Rene, and she took the Price surname as her own, becoming Rene Louise Price. The Price family moved to Boulder, Colorado, in 1941, and Rene was educated in the Boulder public schools.

Rene Price attended Boulder High School, writing for the school newspaper The Daily Owl, and graduated in 1946. She went on to study history at the University of Colorado, but dropped her studies when she married in the fall of 1948.

Career

"Astronaut Wife"
In the late 1950s and through the 1960s, the astronauts and their wives became national celebrities, with exclusive LIFE magazine rights to their "personal stories"; the stresses of life in the public eye led the women of Mercury 7 to form an informal support group later called the Astronaut Wives Club. Carpenter was often singled out for her appearance. The Washington Post in 1961 described her as a "striking platinum blonde". 
In 1962, Time called her "by anyone's standards a dish". In 1975, People called her "the undisputed prom queen of the early space program." But she also had writing talent. Life published Rene's first-person feature story on her experiences, both as a career military wife and on the events during her husband's May 24, 1962, flight aboard Aurora 7.

In 2015, she was portrayed by Yvonne Strahovski in the miniseries The Astronaut Wives Club, based on the 2013 book by the same title. Carpenter herself was critical of both the book and the show, telling the Washington Post, it was "pure fiction." 

Rene Carpenter has been credited for volunteering her husband for spaceflight. But Scott Carpenter, then a lieutenant commander in the U.S. Navy, had already been identified as a candidate for Project Mercury at Phase 1, in late 1958, and had reported to the Pentagon in February 1959 for the Phase 2 briefings and interviews. It was at the Pentagon that Carpenter volunteered to proceed with the selection process. In late February 1959, with her husband aboard the USS Hornet on sea trials, Rene intercepted a letter from NASA inviting Scott to report to the Lovelace Clinic for the Phase 3 selection trials. The USN lieutenant commander had been asked to reply "by Monday." Rene opened the letter on a Tuesday morning, immediately calling the telephone number supplied, reaching NASA's manpower director Dr. Allen O. Gamble: "We volunteer," Rene exclaimed to a startled Dr. Gamble. Carpenter would report to Lovelace in March with his small group and was ultimately selected as a Project Mercury astronaut. She began writing her syndicated column, "A Woman, Still", in 1965, ending the column in 1969. After their divorce, and at the invitation of Washington Post publisher Kay Graham, who owned the local CBS affiliate, WTOP, Rene developed and hosted a TV show entitled Everywoman, airing weekly on Saturday night. It took on then-controversial themes of the feminist movement.

Politics 
In 1968, she campaigned for Robert Kennedy. She had a syndicated women's page column, "A Woman, Still", and from 1972 to 1976, was a television host, first with Everywoman and then with Nine in the Morning. She worked for Committee for National Health Insurance.

Personal life
She first met Scott Carpenter when she was working as an 'usherette' at the Boulder Theater, where her husband-to-be was also an usher. They married in Boulder, Colorado, St. John's Episcopal Church, September 9, 1948. In November 1949, their first child, Marc Scott, was born in Boulder; thirteen months later, at Pensacola Naval Air Station, Florida, Rene and Scott welcomed a second son, Timothy. "Timmy" died at age six months, in San Diego, where her husband was preparing for his tour of duty in the Korean conflict (1951–1954). The couple had three more children.

Scott Carpenter resigned from NASA in August 1967 and moved with Rene and their children to Bethesda, Md., where the U.S. Navy's Deep Sea Submergence Project (SEALAB) was headquartered. Rene continued writing her column until she and Scott separated in 1969, the year Scott Carpenter resigned his U.S. Navy commission; the couple divorced in 1972. She married Lester H. Shor, a builder and real estate developer, in 1977. She continued to use her professional name, Rene Carpenter.

Rene Carpenter died of congestive heart failure on July 24, 2020, in a Denver hospital. She was 92. Of the fourteen men and women of Project Mercury, Rene was the last surviving member; Annie Glenn had died two months earlier, on May 19, 2020.

References

1928 births
2020 deaths
20th-century American journalists
20th-century American women writers
American columnists
American women columnists
American women television presenters
Journalists from Iowa
Mercury Seven
People from Bethesda, Maryland
People from Clinton, Iowa
Rene
University of Colorado alumni
Women's page journalists